Better Watch Out (formerly titled Safe Neighborhood) is a 2016 Christmas psychological horror film directed by Chris Peckover, from a script he co-wrote with Zack Kahn. It stars Olivia DeJonge, Levi Miller and Ed Oxenbould. The film had its world premiere at Fantastic Fest on September 22, 2016, and was released in the United States on October 6, 2017, by Well Go USA and in Australia on November 23, 2017, by Rialto Distribution.

Plot
At Christmas time, 17-year-old Ashley is babysitting precocious 12-year-old Luke Lerner. Luke has romantic feelings for Ashley and unsuccessfully attempts to seduce her while watching a horror film. Strange happenings outside put Ashley on edge, but it ultimately appears to be just Luke's best friend, Garrett, who has arrived to visit. Hearing a window break upstairs, the trio find a brick inscribed with "U leave and U die." Garrett panics and runs out the back door, but is apparently killed by an unknown shooter.

Shocked, Ashley and Luke run upstairs and hide in the attic. Ashley almost breaks her neck from a fall but Luke catches her. After they run into Luke's room and hide in his closet, a masked intruder armed with a shotgun walks in. Ashley recognizes the mask as one of Luke's and tells the intruder to take it off, revealing Garrett. Ashley realizes that Luke was hoping to seduce her by scaring her and staging a rescue. Angered, Ashley yells at Luke, calling him mental and saying he needs therapy and tries to leave. Luke follows behind Ashley and once at the top of the stairs Luke slaps her, causing her to fall down the stairs and be knocked unconscious.

Luke binds Ashley with duct tape, forcing her to play truth or dare. Her boyfriend Ricky arrives at the house after receiving a text message sent by Ashley earlier. When Ricky fails to find Ashley, he realizes that something is wrong. Luke tries to knock him out but fails. After nearly killing Luke, Ricky is threatened by Garrett with the shotgun. Luke knocks Ricky out and they tie him up beside Ashley.

While Ashley uses a shard of glass to cut herself free, Luke tries to show Garrett what happens if you actually hit someone in the head with a swinging paint can, based on a scene from the film Home Alone. Luke tries to demonstrate with Ricky but misses on the first swing. Ashley gets free and threatens Luke with a gun. He releases the paint can, which hits and kills Ricky. When Ashley realizes the gun is empty, she tries to escape to a group of carolers outside. Luke uses the brick tossed through the upstairs window to knock her out again before she can alert them.

Luke calls Ashley's ex-boyfriend, Jeremy, claiming that she wants him to write an apology letter. While Jeremy does so, Luke hangs him from a tree, making the apology look like a suicide note. Garrett has a change of heart and starts to free Ashley, but is killed by Luke. Luke stabs Ashley in the neck and stages the scene to frame Jeremy. Later, he goes to bed and waits for the return of his parents, who contact the police. Ashley survives, having placed duct tape over the stab wound to stop the bleeding. Luke watches from his bedroom window as Ashley gives him the finger before being wheeled into the ambulance.
In a post - credit scene, Luke tells his mother that he is "worried" about Ashley and wants to visit her at the hospital.

Cast
 Olivia DeJonge as Ashley
 Levi Miller as Luke Lerner
 Ed Oxenbould as Garrett
 Aleks Mikic as Ricky
 Dacre Montgomery as Jeremy
 Patrick Warburton as Robert Lerner
 Virginia Madsen as Deandra Lerner

Production 
The film was shot in Sydney, Australia, in January and February 2016. It was originally set to be filmed in South Carolina for $500,000 when director Chris Peckover was approached by Australian producer Brett Thornquest, who offered a $3million budget to shoot the film in Australia after hearing Peckover's mother was an Australian native.

Release
In May 2017, North American distribution rights to Better Watch Out were acquired by Well Go USA, which released the film theatrically and through video on demand on October 6, 2017. In Australia, it was released in select theaters on November 23, 2017, by Rialto Distribution.

Home media
The film was released on DVD and Blu-ray by Well Go USA on December 5, 2017.

Reception

Critical response
The site's critical consensus reads, "Carried by its charismatic young cast, Better Watch Out is an adorably sinister holiday horror film." On Metacritic, the film has a weighted average score of 67 out of 100 based on 13 critics, indicating "generally favorable reviews".

Luke Buckmaster of The Guardian gave the film a rating of 4 stars out of 5 and praised the performances of the actors, saying that, "deranged mind games and faultless performances in Christmas horror". Bill Goodykoontz of AZ Central praised the performances of the actors: "The performances are uniformly good" and concluded his review by saying that, "Better Watch Out is for fans of twisted, unhinged horror" and gave the film a rating of 3.5 stars out of 5. Simon Abrams of RogerEbert.com was not impressed with the film and said that, "Better Watch Out is an infuriating sit because it requires you to invest in the programmatic bullying of a certain type of character, then cheer on that same stock type as he or she defies expectations and refuses to be pummeled into oblivion. [...] When the film ends, we've been traded one set of unchallenging cliches for another" and gave the film a rating of 1 star out of 4.

Accolades

See also
 Holiday horror
 List of films set around Christmas

References

External links
 
 

2016 films
2016 comedy horror films
2016 horror thriller films
2016 psychological thriller films
2010s American films
2010s Australian films
2010s Christmas comedy films
2010s Christmas horror films
2010s comedy thriller films
2010s English-language films
2010s psychological horror films
2010s teen horror films
American Christmas comedy films
American Christmas horror films
American comedy horror films
American comedy thriller films
American horror thriller films
American psychological horror films
American psychological thriller films
American teen horror films
Australian Christmas comedy films
Australian comedy horror films
Australian comedy thriller films
Australian horror thriller films
Australian teen comedy films
Films shot in Sydney
Home invasions in film